The Alpine Path is an autobiography of Lucy Maud Montgomery. Originally published as series of autobiographical essays in the Toronto magazine Everywoman's World from June to November in 1917, and later separately published in 1974.

References

External links
 
 The Alpine Path: The Story of My Career on-line text of BUILD-A-BOOK Initiative
 
 L.M. Montgomery's Personal Scrapbooks and Book Covers
 The L.M. Montgomery Literary Society This site  includes information about Montgomery's works and life and research from the newsletter, The Shining Scroll. Read about The Alpine Path on our L.M. Montgomery Biography page.
 L.M. Montgomery Online Formerly the L.M. Montgomery Research Group, this site includes a blog, extensive lists of primary and secondary materials, detailed information about Montgomery's publishing history, and a filmography of screen adaptations of Montgomery texts. See, in particular, the page about The Alpine Path.

Canadian autobiographies
Books by Lucy Maud Montgomery
1917 non-fiction books
1974 non-fiction books
Literature first published in serial form
University of Michigan